Maryan Street (born 5 April 1955) is a New Zealand unionist and former member of the New Zealand House of Representatives, having been elected to parliament in the 2005 general election as a member of the New Zealand Labour Party. She served as the Minister of Housing and Minister for ACC in the final years of the Fifth Labour Government and was the first openly gay female MP elected to the New Zealand Parliament.

Early years
Street was born and raised in New Plymouth. In her youth, she intended to become a Presbyterian minister but instead studied at Victoria University of Wellington, receiving a BA (Hons) in 1976. She joined the Labour Party in 1984, and was President of the Labour Party from April 1993 to November 1995. In 1990 she was appointed Director of Labour Studies at Auckland University, where she gained a Master of Philosophy in Industrial Relations in 1993.  She served on the boards of government agencies Housing New Zealand and the Crown Forestry Rental Trust. In 1990 she was awarded the New Zealand 1990 Commemoration Medal for service to New Zealand.

In 1993, Street was awarded the New Zealand Suffrage Centennial Medal for service to women.

Member of Parliament

Street contested the 2005 election for the Labour Party. She was ranked thirty-sixth on the party list. This was the second highest position given by Labour in 2005 to a person who was not already a member of Parliament. She also unsuccessfully contested the safe National seat of Taranaki-King Country against the incumbent National Party MP, Shane Ardern. Street was elected to parliament as a list MP. She was re-elected as a list MP in 2008 and 2011, each time also unsuccessfully contesting the Nelson electorate.

In her first speech to the New Zealand Parliament in 2005 Street set out a human rights agenda. She said she stood for public office to campaign for social justice and believed human rights were at the core of democracy. “I have not come into this House to be less than brave about the human rights of those whom some would seek to marginalise. I seek an inclusive, just, and tolerant society as one that is more likely to be peaceful, productive, and safe for our children to grow up in. A pluralist society is stable because of its differences, not despite them. It is the very differences between people, working together peacefully and with respect for each other, that allow a society to remain strong and cohesive.”

As a first-term MP Street was deputy chair of the Health Committee for two years. She was appointed to Cabinet in 2007 and served, for the final year of the Clark Government, as Minister of Housing, Minister for the Accident Compensation Corporation, Associate Minister of Tertiary Education, and Associate Minister of Economic Development. For Street's second and third terms, Labour was in Opposition. She held various roles for the party including spokesperson for tertiary education, trade, Treaty of Waitangi negotiations, health, state services and foreign affairs.

Street championed law changes to address tenants’ insurance rights, ethical investment, banning the importation of goods made by slave labour, and the right to die with dignity, though none were enacted. She has also been a lead supporter of legislated human rights for the LGBTQI communities.

Street advocated on behalf of political prisoners and refugees from Myanmar. In 2010 she put a motion before the New Zealand Parliament to affirm the commitment to human rights for political prisoners in Myanmar and visited Myanmar in November 2012 to observe the rollout of the Gavi vaccination programme. Street supported the professional development of young leaders from Myanmar and participated in the Ministry of Foreign Affairs and Trade's Myanmar Young Leaders Programme.

Retirement from Parliament 
Street again contested Nelson in the 2014 general election and was ranked 15th on the Labour list. Despite this relatively high placing, Labour's poor result meant she did not return as an MP. When Jacinda Ardern resigned her list position after winning the 2017 Mount Albert by-election, Street had the option (as the next highest-placed Labour list candidate) to re-enter Parliament. However, she declined the offer.

After leaving Parliament Street continued to maintain a high profile as a campaigner for other human rights causes and employment relations. She has worked for KiwiRail since 2015.

International work
Street worked as an international observer of general elections across Africa and Asia, mostly on behalf of the Commonwealth, with a focus on human rights and good governance.

In 2007 she travelled to Lesotho to join the Commonwealth Expert Team observing the parliamentary elections.

In 2009 the United Nations Development Programme asked her to participate in a seminar in Addis Ababa, Ethiopia, on the issue of power sharing in multi-party democracies.

She represented New Zealand at a joint European Parliament-United Nations conference of international parliamentarians in Istanbul, Turkey, in 2012. The conference addressed the implementation of the programme of action of the International Conference on Population and Development.

She returned to Lesotho in 2015 as a member of the Commonwealth Observer Group for the Lesotho National Assembly elections.

In 2018 she was a member of the Commonwealth Observer Group which assessed the general elections in Sierra Leone.
 
She was a member of the Commonwealth Observer Group which monitored the 2019 Parliamentary elections in Maldives.
 
She is an alumna of the New Zealand Commonwealth Women Parliamentarians group, part of the Commonwealth Parliamentary Association (CPA), which works to increase gender diversity in CPA activities and programmes.

References

External links

 MPs webpage 

1955 births
Living people
New Zealand Labour Party MPs
Members of the Cabinet of New Zealand
Ministers of Housing (New Zealand)
Lesbian politicians
University of Auckland alumni
Academic staff of the University of Auckland
Victoria University of Wellington alumni
Women government ministers of New Zealand
LGBT members of the Parliament of New Zealand
New Zealand list MPs
Members of the New Zealand House of Representatives
Unsuccessful candidates in the 2014 New Zealand general election
People from New Plymouth
21st-century New Zealand politicians
21st-century New Zealand women politicians
Women members of the New Zealand House of Representatives
Recipients of the New Zealand Suffrage Centennial Medal 1993